The Soap Opera Digest Award for Outstanding Villainess in a Drama Series – Daytime has been given every year since the first Soap Opera Digest Award in 1984 until the award's end in 2005. There were no awards presented in 1987, 2002 or 2004. The category was split up into Soap Opera Digest Award for Outstanding Villain/Villainess in a Drama Series – Daytime only in 1993, 1994, and 2000.

In the lists below, the winner of the award for each year is shown first, followed by the other nominees. In 1984 and 1985, the nominees aren't listed only the winners.

Winners

Outstanding Villain/Villainess

Multiple wins

Total awards won

References

Soap Opera Digest Awards